Adams Township is one of the fifteen townships of Seneca County, Ohio, United States.  The 2010 census found 1,320 people in the township.

Geography
Located in the northeastern part of the county, it borders the following townships:
Green Creek Township, Sandusky County - north
York Township, Sandusky County - northeast corner
Thompson Township - east
Reed Township - southeast corner
Scipio Township - south
Clinton Township - southwest corner
Pleasant Township - west
Ballville Township, Sandusky County - northwest corner

Part of the village of Green Springs is located in northern Adams Township.

Name and history
Adams Township was organized in 1826. It was named for John Quincy Adams, sixth President of the United States.

It is one of ten Adams Townships statewide.

Government
The township is governed by a three-member board of trustees, who are elected in November of odd-numbered years to a four-year term beginning on the following January 1. Two are elected in the year after the presidential election and one is elected in the year before it. There is also an elected township fiscal officer, who serves a four-year term beginning on April 1 of the year after the election, which is held in November of the year before the presidential election. Vacancies in the fiscal officership or on the board of trustees are filled by the remaining trustees.

Township officials

References

External links
Township website
County website

Townships in Seneca County, Ohio
Townships in Ohio